Sherwood House is a historic home located at Yonkers, Westchester County, New York. It was built in 1740 and is a 3-story frame structure on an exposed basement built into a hillside.  Additions and modifications took place about 1810, 1850, and 1880.  It features a 2-story porch spanning the entire facade and 2 dutch doors. The house was extensively remodeled in 1955.  Also on the property is a -story, frame caretaker's cottage and a barn.  Both were built about 1840.

It was added to the National Register of Historic Places in 1984.  It is now owned by the Yonkers Historical Society, which offers tours.

References

External links
Yonkers History website

Houses on the National Register of Historic Places in New York (state)
Houses completed in 1740
Buildings and structures in Yonkers, New York
Historic house museums in Westchester County, New York
National Register of Historic Places in Yonkers, New York